The Newark Earthworks in Newark and Heath, Ohio, consist of three sections of preserved earthworks: the Great Circle Earthworks, the Octagon Earthworks, and the Wright Earthworks. This complex, built by the Hopewell culture between 100 BCE and 400 CE, contains the largest earthen enclosures in the world, and was about 3,000 acres in total extent. Newark's Octagon and Great Circle Earthworks are managed by the Ohio History Connection. A designated National Historic Landmark, in 2006 the Newark Earthworks was also designated as the "official prehistoric monument of the State of Ohio."

This is part of the Hopewell Ceremonial Earthworks, one of 14 sites nominated in January 2008 by the U.S. Department of the Interior for potential submission by the United States to the UNESCO World Heritage List.

History 
Built by the Hopewell culture between 100 BCE and 400 CE, the earthworks were used by the indigenous Native Americans as places of ceremony, social gathering, trade, worship, and honoring the dead. The primary purpose of the Octagon earthwork was believed to have been scientific. Scholars have demonstrated that the Octagon Earthworks comprise a lunar observatory for tracking the moon's orbit during its 18.6-year cycle.

While limited, the Newark Earthwork site is the largest surviving Hopewell earthwork complex in North America. The culture built many earthen mounds.  Over decades, they built what is the single largest earthwork enclosure complex in the Ohio River Valley.  The earthworks cover several square miles.

The complex was one of hundreds of Native American ancient monuments identified and surveyed for the Smithsonian Institution in the mid-nineteenth century by Ephraim G. Squier and Edwin Hamilton Davis, from 1837–1847.  The work that was published by a nascent Smithsonian Institution was titled Ancient Monuments of the Mississippi Valley.   This study of the prehistoric Mound Builders of North America was a landmark in American scientific research and the early development of archaeology as a scientific discipline. The book was the first volume of the Smithsonian Institution's Contributions to Knowledge series and the Institution's first publication.  Squier and Davis' detailed and measured plan of the site is shown on this page.

Great Circle Earthworks 

The -wide Newark Earthworks Great Circle (located in Heath, OH) is one of the largest circular earthworks in the Americas, at least in construction effort.

Researchers have used archaeogeodesy and archaeoastronomy to analyze the placements, alignments, dimensions, and site-to-site interrelationships of the earthworks.  This research has revealed that the prehistoric cultures in the area had advanced scientific understanding which they used as the basis of their complex construction.

Octagon Earthworks
The Octagon Earthworks consists of an Observatory Mound (connected at the southwestern edge of Observatory Circle), Observatory Circle (20 acres), and the connected Octagon (50 acres). The Octagon is joined by parallel walls to Observatory Circle .

In 1982 researchers from Earlham College in Richmond, Indiana concluded that the complex was a lunar observatory, designed to track motions of the moon, including the northernmost point of the 18.6-year cycle of the lunar orbit. When viewed from the observatory mound, the moon rises at that time within one-half of a degree of the octagon's exact center. The earthwork is twice as precise as the complex at Stonehenge (assuming Stonehenge is an observatory, which is a disputed theory).

From 1892 to 1908, the state of Ohio used the Octagon Earthworks as a militia encampment. Immediately after this, the Newark Board of Trade owned the property, until 1918. In 1910, they leased the property to Mound Builders Country Club (MBCC), which developed the site as a golf course. As a result of a Licking County Common Pleas Court case, a trustee was named to manage the property from 1918 to 1933.

In 1997 the Ohio Historical Society (now the Ohio History Connection) signed a lease until 2078 with the country club. MBCC maintains, secures, and provides restricted public access to the land. Some citizens believe the country club is an inappropriate use of the sacred site. There has been increasing public interest in the earthworks. Activists have pressed for more public access to the site to witness the moonrise, which observance was planned in the design and construction by the original native builders.

Wright Earthworks
The Wright Earthworks consist of a fragment of a geometrically near-perfect square enclosure and part of one wall that originally formed a set of parallel embankments, which led from the enclosure to a large oval yard.

Much of the square enclosure and its associated mounds was destroyed during nineteenth-century European-American development: construction related to building the Ohio Canal, as well as the streets and houses of the city of Newark. Clearing and cultivation of fields for farming also destroyed much of the monument.

The Wright Earthworks are named in honor of Mrs. Frances Rees Wright, who donated the site in 1934 to the Ohio Historical Society.

Gallery
Color photos are of the Great Circle, located in Heath. The black-and-white photos of the Octagon Earthworks in Newark were taken from the air in the 1980s, showing the interposition of country club golf sand traps and greens with the surviving parts of the ancient circles, walls, Observatory Circle and Octagon.

See also
 Earthwork (archaeology)
 Fort Ancient
 Hopewell Culture National Historical Park
 List of Hopewell sites
 Mound builder (people)
 List of National Historic Landmarks in Ohio

References

External links

Newark Earthworks, The Ancient Ohio Trail
 Official website from the Ohio Historical Society
 The Newark Earthworks Center, The Ohio State University
 Hopewell Ceremonial Earthworks UNESCO World Heritage Nomination
 The Great Circle Earthwork, Newark, Ohio
 The Octagon Earthworks: A Neolithic Lunar Observatory

Ohio Hopewell
National Historic Landmarks in Ohio
State parks of Ohio
Symbols of Ohio
Land art
Newark, Ohio
National Register of Historic Places in Licking County, Ohio
Ohio History Connection
Mounds in Ohio
Archaeological sites on the National Register of Historic Places in Ohio